In number theory, Agrawal's conjecture, due to Manindra Agrawal in 2002, forms the basis for the cyclotomic AKS test. Agrawal's conjecture states formally:

Let  and  be two coprime positive integers. If 

then either  is prime or

Ramifications

Truth or falsehood
The conjecture was formulated by Rajat Bhattacharjee and Prashant Pandey in their 2001 thesis.

However, a heuristic argument by Carl Pomerance and Hendrik W. Lenstra suggests there are infinitely many counterexamples.

Assuming Agrawal's conjecture is false by the above argument, Roman B. Popovych conjectures a modified version may still be true:

Let  and  be two coprime positive integers. If 

and

Distributed computing 
Both Agrawal's conjecture and Popovych's conjecture were tested by distributed computing project Primaboinca which ran from 2010 to 2020, based on BOINC.

Notes

External links
 Primaboinca project

Conjectures about prime numbers